Roe is a surname. Notable people with the surname include:

 Alban Roe (1583–1642), English Benedictine martyr
 Alliott Verdon Roe (1877–1958), British aircraft manufacturer
 Allison Roe (born 1956), New Zealand marathon runner and politician
 Anna Wang Roe (born 1959), American neuroscientist
 Anne Roe (1904–1991), American clinical psychologist and researcher
 Arthur Roe (politician) (1878–1942), American politician and lawyer
 Arthur Stanley Roe, medical doctor from Queensland, Australia
 Arthur Roe (footballer) (1892–1960), English football half back
 Brian Roe (1939–2014), English cricketer
 Charles Roe (1715–1781), English industrialist
 David Roe (born 1965), English snooker player
 Edward Payson Roe (1838–1888), American novelist
 Erica Roe (born 1957), Twickenham streaker
 Sir Francis Roe (died 1620), Irish politician
 Francis Asbury Roe (1823–1901), United States Navy admiral
 James M. Roe (born 1943), American astronomer
 Jane Roe (pseudonym), a legal pseudonym similar to Jane Doe
 Jerry D. Roe (born 1936), American academic
 John B. Roe (born 1942), American lawyer and politician
 John Septimus Roe (1797–1878), first Surveyor-General of Western Australia
 Kris Roe, member of The Ataris
 Marie Roe, married name of Marie Stopes
 Marion Roe (born 1936), British politician
 Marrion Roe (1935–2017), New Zealand Olympic swimmer
 Michael Roe (born 1954), American record producer
 Philip L. Roe, professor of aerospace engineering
 Philippa Roe, Baroness Couttie (1962–2022), British politician
 Reginald Heber Roe (1850–1926), 2nd headmaster of Brisbane Grammar School, 1st vice chancellor of University of Queensland
 Richard Roe (pseudonym), a legal pseudonym similar to John Doe
 Robert A. Roe (born 1924), member of U.S. House of Representatives
 Sir Thomas Roe (or Row, c. 1581–1644), English traveller and diplomat of the Elizabethan and Jacobean periods. His voyages ranged from Central America to India; he was English ambassador to the Mughal Empire, the Ottoman Empire, and the Holy Roman Empire 
 Tim Roe (born 1989), Australian cyclist
 Tommy Roe (born 1942), American pop music singer and songwriter
 William Gordon Roe (1932–1999), Bishop of Huntingdon

See also
Rowe (surname)

English-language surnames